Charles Denny may refer to:
Charles R. Denny (1912–2000), general counsel of the United States Federal Communications Commission
Charles Denny (cyclist), British cyclist
Charles L. Denny, namesake of Denny-Blaine Park (Seattle)
Sir Charles Alistair Maurice Denny, 4th Baronet (born 1950), of the Denny baronets

See also
Charles Dennée (1863–1946), American composer